Amata bondo is a moth of the subfamily Arctiinae. It was described by Sergius G. Kiriakoff in 1965. It is found in the Democratic Republic of the Congo.

References

 

bondo
Moths described in 1965
Moths of Africa
Endemic fauna of the Democratic Republic of the Congo